Genealogy tourism, sometimes called roots tourism, is a segment of the tourism market consisting of tourists who have ancestral connections to their holiday destination. These genealogy tourists travel to the land of their ancestors to reconnect with their past and "walk in the footsteps of their forefathers".
 
Genealogy tourism is a worldwide industry, although it is more prominent in countries that have experienced mass emigration at some time in history and thus have a large worldwide diaspora community.

Europe
Genealogy tourism has been prominent in Ireland; recorded genealogy tourism peaked in the year 2000 as 116,000 genealogical visitors traveled to the island. The Irish Tourist Board ceased recording genealogy visitors numbers in 2004, and its present levels are now unknown.  Scotland staged a homecoming festival in 2009 to appeal to genealogy tourists.

Genealogy tourism is very common to countries of Central Europe where World War II caused mass migrations of population. In particular, Jewish genealogy tourism is very popular and on the rise. Scottish diaspora and genealogical tourism has always been a large part of Scottish tourism.

Africa
Many African Americans and other diaspora Africans in the Americas were motivated to travel to their traditional African homelands following the release of Alex Haley's best-selling book Roots: The Saga of an American Family in 1976. Areas frequently visited include Cape Coast and Elmina in Ghana, Goree Island in Senegal, Juffureh in Gambia and Bahia in Brazil. African governments recognized this opportunity for development in tourism. Successive governments in Ghana, for example, have made efforts through the Ministry of Tourism to attract Diaspora Africans to Ghana, including the African African-American summit in 1999, the biannual Pan-African Historical Theatre Festival, Emancipation Day celebrations and Juneteenth.

Genealogy
Genealogy tourists often participate in tracing their ancestral lineages; digital access to historical records, as well as DNA studies in recent years, have allowed an increasing number of people to identify the homelands of their ancestors.

See also
Birthright Armenia
Birthright Israel
Door of Return
Year of Return, Ghana 2019

References

Tourism
Types of tourism
Diasporas